The Street Next to the Moon is a 1951 Argentine romantic drama film directed by Román Viñoly Barreto.

Cast
  Narciso Ibáñez Menta …Evaristo Carriego
  Isabel Pradas
  Diana Ingro
  Raúl del Valle
  Elisardo Santalla
  María Armand
  Silvia Labardén
  Carlos Belluci
  Iris Láinez
  Juan Carrara
  Luis de Tejada
  Ángel Laborde …Florencio Sánchez
  Néstor Atilio Yoan …Enrique Carriego
  Enrique Serrano…Charles de Soussans
  Amalia Bernabé
  Fernando Siro
  Mario Cossa …Niño inválido
  Francisco Barletta
  Nicandro Fuente

References

External links
 

1951 films
1950s Spanish-language films
Argentine black-and-white films
Argentine romantic drama films
1951 romantic drama films
1950s English-language films
1950s Argentine films